The 2013 California Golden Bears football team represented the University of California, Berkeley in the 2013 NCAA Division I FBS football season. This was Cal's first year of being led by the head coach Sonny Dykes. Cal's athletic director Sandy Barbour stated that it was his emphasis on offense that was the primary factor in the decision. Dykes was hired from Louisiana Tech, and was known for his reliance on the pass heavy and high scoring Air Raid offense, that utilized a shotgun formation with four wide receivers. Cal finished this season with a 1–11 record, with Dykes becoming the first head coach since the University began playing football in 1886 to fail to defeat a single D-1 opponent in a season that has lasted at least five games. The Bears lost to Stanford by 50 points, the largest margin ever in the 119-year history of the Big Game. During the season, the team was featured on The Drive, a weekly documentary series on the Pac-12 Network.

One of the season's few positives was the performance of true freshman Jared Goff as the starting quarterback. Under Dyke's Air Raid offense, Goff delivered a record-breaking season, setting Cal single-season records for passing yards (3,508), yardage gained (3,508), total offense (3,446), passes completed (320), and passes attempted (530).

Schedule

Game summaries

Northwestern

Portland State

Ohio State

Oregon

Washington State

Cal holds a 44–25–5 record in the series and had won the last eight meetings. This was the Cougar's first victory against the Golden Bears in 11 years.  Their last victory occurred in 2002 where the Cougars beat the Golden Bears 48-18 at Memorial Stadium.

1st quarter scoring: WSU – Vince Mayle 35-yard pass from Connor Halliday (Andrew Furney kick); WSU – Jeremiah Laufasa 5-yard run (Furney kick)

2nd quarter scoring: CAL – Deandre Coleman 2-yard safety on Teondray Caldwell; CAL – Vincenzo D'Amato 35-yard field goal; CAL – Chris Harper 89-yard pass from Jared Goff (D'Amato kick); WSU – Marcus Mason 68-yard from Halliday (Furney kick); CAL – D'Amato 43-yard field goal

3rd quarter scoring: WSU – Teondray Caldwell 10-yard run (Furney kick); WSU – Vince Mayle 72-yard pass from (Furney Kick); CAL – James Grisom 53-yard pass from Goff (D'Amato kick)

4th quarter scoring: WSU – Furney 44-yard field goal; WSU –  Furney 41-yard field goal; WSU – Furney 28-yard field goal

UCLA

California is 32–50–1 against UCLA since the series began in 1933. This was Sonny Dykes first year taking on the Bruins as California's head coach.

1st quarter scoring: UCLA	– Ka'imi Fairbairn 24-yard field goal; UCLA – Devin Fuller 18-yard pass from Brett Hundley (Fairbairn kick)

2nd quarter scoring: UCLA	– Paul Perkins 1-yard run (Fairbairn kick); CAL	– Vincenzo D'Amato 51-yard field goal; 	
CAL – Daniel Lasco 6-yard run (D'Amato Kick); UCLA – Thomas Duarte 27-yard pass from Hundley (Fairbairn kick)

3rd quarter scoring:  UCLA – Fairbairn 22-yard field goal; UCLA – Fairbairn 27-yard field goal

4th quarter scoring: UCLA	– Shaquelle Evans 22-yard pass from Hundley (Fairbairn kick)

Oregon State

Washington

Arizona

1st quarter scoring: CAL – Khalf Muhammad 11-yard pass from Jared Goff (Vincen D'Amato kick); ARIZ – B. Denker 9-yard run (J. Smith kick); ARIZ – Team safety

2nd quarter scoring: ARIZ – Smith 53-yard field goal; ARIZ – N. Phillips 21-yard pass from Denker (Smith kick);
CAL – Kenny Lawler 17-yard pass from Goff (D'Amato kick)

3rd quarter scoring: ARIZ – Denker 1-yard run (Smith kick); CAL – Lawler 3-yard pass from Goff (D'Amato kick); ARIZ – Denker 14-yard run (Smith kick)

4th quarter scoring:
CAL – Lawler 29-yard pass from Goff (D'Amato kick)

USC

1st quarter scoring: USC – Nelson Agholor 75-yard punt return (Andre Heidari kick); USC – Silas Redd 12-yard pass from Cody Kessler (Heidari kick); USC – Javorius Allen 43-yard (Heidari kick)

2nd quarter scoring: CAL – Kenny Lawler 4-yard pass from Jared Goff (Vincen D'Amato kick) ; CAL – Darius Powe 24-yard pass from Goff (D'Amato kick); USC – Allen 57-yard pass from Kessler (Heidari kick); USC – Josh Shaw 86-yard punt return (Heidari kick); USC – Agholor 93-yard punt return (kick missed)

3rd quarter scoring: USC – Allen 79-yard run (Heidari kick); USC – Ty Isaac 4-yard run (Heidari kick); CAL – Khalfani Muhammad 7-yard run (D'Amato kick)

4th quarter scoring: USC – Isaac 37-yard run (Heidari kick); CAL – Lawler 4-yard pass from Goff (D'Amato kick)

Colorado

Stanford

In a 63–13 victory, #10 Stanford broke the record for most points scored in a Big Game and for the largest margin of victory.  With the victory, Stanford clinched the Pac-12 North Division Championship while Cal ended their season at 1–11, the most losses in one season in Cal football history.

1st quarter scoring: STAN - T. Montgomery 31-yard run (J. Williamson kick) CAL - Maurice Harris 15-yard pass from Goff, Jared (Vincen D’Amato kick); STAN - Montgomery 50-yard pass from K. Hogan (Williamson kick); STAN - Montgomery 12-yard pass from Hogan (Williamson kick); CAL - D’Amato 29-yard field goal

2nd quarter scoring: STAN - Montgomery 72-yard pass from Hogan (Williamson kick); STAN – M. Rector 45-yard pass from Hogan (Williamson kick); CAL - D’Amato 47-yard field goal; STAN - Montgomery 9-yard pass from Hogan (Williamson kick)

3rd quarter scoring: STAN - Gaffney,T 58-yard run (C. Ukropina kick)

4th quarter scoring: STAN – K. Young 27-yard run (Ukropina kick); STAN – F. Owusu 14-yard pass from E. Crower (Ukropina kick)

Awards
 September 2, 2013 – Vincenzo D'Amato, PK, was named Pac-12 Conference special teams player of the week

References

California
California Golden Bears football seasons
California Golden Bears football